Historia de un clan is an Argentine TV series made in 2015 by Telefe, starring Alejandro Awada. It is based on the 1980s exploits of the real-life Puccio family.

Plot
The Puccio are apparently a family like any other: Arquímedes (Alejandro Awada), the father, has a plan in hand, for which he needs the help of his family. This is how he reunites his children, Alejandro (Chino Darín) and Daniel (Nazareno Casero), to help him bring about the company. Arquímedes house would become the center of operations, maintaining a life of contrasts. The story tells the family organization of the crime, the connections of  Arquímedes Puccio with other criminal gangs and the unsustainable innocence of this story based on real events.

Production
The first episode includes a nude scene by Chino Darín, who plays a rugby player. This was the first scene of male full frontal nudity aired on Argentine television in almost 60 years. The writer, Javier Van de Couter, joked about it on social networks, generating many responses.

Reception

Rating
The first episode garnered 16.2 rating points. It was the second most-seen TV program of the day, following the last episode of the Binbir Gece rerun. It surpassed the miniseries Signos, which achieved 10.6 rating points.

Critical reception
Silvina Lamazares of the Clarín newspaper praised the quality of the series. She considered it the best work of actor Alejandro Awada's for television, and the consolidation of Chino Darín as an actor. The TV series has been compared with the film The Clan, released the same year, which is also based on the story of the Puccio family. According to Infobae, both productions have a "tense and hostile" mood, but the miniseries allows for the development of the story at a slower pace and the exploration of the characters in greater depth. Infobae also noted that Awada and Darín's characters received the most focus in the first episode, but considers that Cecilia Roth, Gustavo Garzón, Pablo Cedrón, Nazareno Casero, and Tristán Díaz Ocampo may have greater roles as the story develops.

Awards and nominations

Cast
Note: The names of the characters except for the Puccio family and Mónica Sörvick were changed for dramaturgical reasons, the real names are in brackets.

 Alejandro Awada as Arquímedes Rafael Puccio 
 Cecilia Roth as Epifanía Ángeles Calvo de Puccio
 Chino Darín as Alejandro Puccio
 Nazareno Casero as Daniel Arquímedes "Maguila" Puccio
 María Soldi as Silvia Inés Puccio 
 Rita Pauls as Adriana Claudia Puccio
 Justina Bustos as Mónica Sörvick
 Pablo Cedrón (†) as Labarde (Guillermo Fernández Laborde)
 Gustavo Garzón as Rojas (Roberto Díaz)
 Matías Mayer as Federico "Fede" Olsen (Ricardo Manoukian) 
 Benjamín Alfonso as Juani
 Enrique Liporace as Gustavo Bonomi (Gustavo Contepomi) 
 Jean Pierre Noher as Roberto Rizzo (Florencio Aulet)
 Verónica Llinás as Angélica Bolena (Nélida Bollini de Prado)
 Coraje Ábalos as Lucas
 Tristán Díaz Ocampo as Coronel Franco (Rodolfo Franco) 
 Victoria Almeida as María Belén (Cecilia Demargazzo)
 Laura Laprida as Paula (Isabel Menditeguy)
 Oscar Ferrigno as Federico's Father
 Marcela Guerty as Federico's Mother
 Martín Slipak as Franco Rizzo (Eduardo Aulet) 
 Guadalupe Docampo as Adela Pozzi (Rogelia Pozzi)
 Tina Serrano as Aurelia (María Esther Aubone)
 Patricio Aramburu as Emir Seguel (Emilio Naum)
 Bárbara Lombardo as Juliana (Alicia Betti)
 Nicolás Condito as Tomás
 Esteban Meloni as Marco
 Fabián Arenillas as Commissar
 Abel Ayala as Rodolfo

Data of interest 
 Guillermo Puccio is nonexistent in the story, leaving the Puccio family with six members instead of seven.
 Daniel Puccio appeared shortly before the second kidnapping, but appears in the series from the beginning.
 Originally it was contemplated that the first actress Norma Aleandro would play Angélica Bolena (Nelida Bollini de Prado), but finally she rejected the offer and was replaced by Verónica Llinás.

References

External links
 Official site 

Argentine crime television series
Telefe original programming
Television series set in the 1980s
2015 Argentine television series debuts
2015 Argentine television series endings
Spanish-language Netflix original programming
Argentine television miniseries